Djahi, Djahy or Tjahi (Egyptian: ḏhj, ḏꜣhy) was the Egyptian designation for southern Retjenu. 

It ran from approximately Ashkelon in Israel to Lebanon and inland as far as Galilee. It was described as the drainage basin of the Jordan River during the battles with Kadesh of the Eighteenth and Nineteenth Dynasties of Egypt.

It was the scene of the Battle of Djahy between Rameses III and the Sea Peoples.

See also 
Names of the Levant

References

Geography of ancient Egypt
Historical regions in Israel
Canaan
Geography of Phoenicia